Mersin Urban History Museum is a private  museum in Mersin, Turkey.

Location and the History
It is a restored 150 year-old house with a prominent bay window.

The museum building was restored and opened by Mustafa Erim on 4 September 2010.

Sections in the museum
The exhibits in the museum are the following:
Atatürk in Mersin: photographs of Atatürk (founder of Turkey) during his visits to Mersin.
Library about Mersin 
Yümüktepe: photographs and documents about the 9000-yr. old tumulus which is situated within the city borders.
Education in Mersin: historical documents collected from 70 schools in Mersin
Castles in Mersin Province: posters and photos of the castles in Mersin Province (see Mersin Archaeology). Although the museum is basically an urban history museum this section includes castles in the greater area.
Notable Mersin citizens (see Notable People)
Liberation of Mersin: Opposition to French occupation in Mersin during the Turkish War of Independence
Mosques and Churches (including inactive ones) in Mersin Province 
Urban History of Mersin (see History)

The museum has also a conference room.

References

Buildings and structures in Mersin
2010 establishments in Turkey
History museums in Turkey
History of Mersin Province
Museums established in 2010
Museums in Mersin Province
City Museums in Turkey